Hayat ol Gheyb (also Romanized as Ḩayāt ol Gheyb; also known as Emāmzādeh Ḩayāt ol Ghīāb, Emāmzādeh Seyyed Moḩammad Hayāt ol Gheyb, and Imāmzādeh Hayāt al Ghā‘ib) is a village in Veysian Rural District, Veysian District, Dowreh County, Lorestan Province, Iran. During the 2006 census, its population was noted to be 287; consisting of 71 families.

References 

Towns and villages in Dowreh County